PROBA-V, or PROBA-Vegetation (the V standing for vegetation and not the Roman numeral for 5), is a satellite in the European Space Agency's PROBA series. It was launched in 2013 with a predicted usable lifetime between 2.5 and 5 years.

Satellite
PROBA-V is a small satellite, assuring the succession of the Vegetation instruments  on board the French SPOT-4 and SPOT-5 Earth observation missions. PROBA-V was initiated by the Space and Aeronautics department of the BELgian Science Policy Office. It is built by QinetiQ Space N.V. and operated by ESA and uses a PROBA platform. PROBA-V will support applications such as land use, worldwide vegetation classification, crop monitoring, famine prediction, food security, disaster monitoring and biosphere studies. The mission was originally conceived as a "gap filler" between the SPOT-5 end-of-life (foreseen mid-2014) and the launch of the constellation of the Sentinel-3A and -3B satellites. Due to delays of the Sentinel programme and because some instrument specifications of the Sentinel3 satellites have meanwhile changed, PROBA-V no longer is a gap filler mission but will assure the continuation of the Vegetation programme as such. The Vegetation, International User Committee (IUC, an independent body consisting of Vegetation users, that provides user feedback and recommendations to the Vegetation Steering Committee) has recommended to foresee a successor mission for PROBA-V, because the current specifications of the Sentinel3 satellites no longer allow the continuation of the Vegetation products in the long run. This mission is the first full application mission with a PROBA platform and had a very tight development schedule.

Development and operations
PROBA-V and its onboard instruments have been developed and built by QinetiQ Space N.V and subcontractors for the Directorate of TEChnology (DTEC) of ESA. These developments have been paid with Belgian and Luxembourg contributions to ESA. The In Orbit Commissioning Review (IOCR) was successfully achieved on 27/11/2013. After the launch and the commissioning, PROBA-V was handed over from DTEC to the Earth Observation Directorate of ESA on 12/12/2013. After this handover the Earth Observation Directorate of ESA will manage the satellite operations, instrument data collection and distribution of the traditional Vegetation products to the users. VITO will actually generate and distribute these products. The management of the new, higher resolution products will be assured by the Space- and Aeronautics department of the BELgian Science Policy Office. For these products too, VITO will actually generate and distribute these higher resolution products.

Onboard instruments

The primary payload of Proba-V is the Vegetation instrument, built by OIP Sensor Systems. This is a reduced-mass version of the Vegetation instrument which was on board the SPOT-4 and -5 satellites to provide a daily overview of global vegetation growth. Traditional Vegetation products generated by these instruments include the 1-day Synthesis products and the 10-day Synthesis products, both with a ground resolution of about 1 km (1 km x 1 km pixel size). Despite the fact that the Vegetation instrument onboard PROBA-V has a higher spatial resolution (smaller groundpixels) than the Vegetation instruments on board the SPOT satellites, the long time series (15 years) of the traditional Vegetation products will be continued by PROBA-V. Thus, PROBA-V will also generate the traditional Vegetation products at approximately 1 km x 1 km ground resolution. The spectral bands (see Electromagnetic spectrum) are nearly identical to the spectral bands of the SPOT Vegetation instruments. Other characteristics of the PROBA-V Vegetation instrument are :

For more detailed specifications and the resulting products that are available to the users, see 

The other, secondary, onboard instruments are :

These secondary instruments are technology demonstrators.

Launch
PROBA-V was launched from ELA-1 at Guiana Space Centre on board Vega flight VV02, on 7 May 2013 together with the Vietnamese VNREDSat 1A satellite, and Estonia's first satellite, ESTCube-1. The launch will mark the first test of the new Vespa dual-payload adapter; PROBA-V will ride in the upper position of the Vespa adapter, and VNREDSat 1A will sit in the lower position.
The usable lifetime of PROBA-V highly depends on the local time of the descending node (LTDN). Given that PROBA-V has no onboard propulsion, the natural drift of this LTDN depends on the satellites' in orbit injection accuracy. Based on the injection accuracy specifications of the VEGA launcher, a usable lifetime between 2.5 and 5 years was predicted. The achieved in orbit injection accuracy is such that the LTDN will be out of the specifications after 5 years.

Data policy
The data policy for the traditional Vegetation products, as provided by the SPOT-Vegetation instruments, was not freely accessible for all users, meaning that for some products, the user had to pay a fee. Only the products older than 3 months were for free for everybody and were delivered on a best effort basis. The data policy of the traditional Vegetation products, as provided by PROBA-V, will be freely accessible for all users. This, so called full, free and open data policy, was approved by the Programme Board for Earth Observation (PBEO) of ESA on 25/9/2013.
The new, higher resolution products of PROBA-V that are older than 1 month, have the same full, free and open data policy. Depending on the kind of user (scientific, commercial, ...) and the kind of higher resolution product (customised or not, guaranteed in time delivery or not, ...) a fee has to be paid for certain other, higher resolution products of PROBA-V. The complete data policy details can be found on

Outreach
On 18 March 2019, Bpost released a souvenir sheet of 5 stamps honouring Belgian space activities, among which PROBA-V's own stamp representing the country's contribution in Earth observation.

See also

List of European Space Agency programs and missions
PROBA
PROBA-2
PROBA-3

References

External links
 European Space Agency PROBA-V
 https://web.archive.org/web/20130524095625/http://proba-v.vgt.vito.be/content/welcome-proba-v-website

European Space Agency
European Space Agency satellites
Earth observation satellites of the European Space Agency
Spacecraft launched in 2013
Spacecraft launched by Vega rockets
Technology demonstrations